Aeromonas schubertii is a Gram-negative, rod-shaped bacterium. Its type strain is ATCC 43700 (CDC 2446–81). It is differentiated from other species by not metabolising D-mannitol. It is resistant to ampicillin and carbenicillin and susceptible to most other agents. It causes infection in several species, including humans and Channa argus.

References

Further reading
Clinical relevance:

External links
 Aeromonas J.P. Euzéby: List of Prokaryotic names with Standing in Nomenclature
UniProt entry
Type strain of Aeromonas schubertii at BacDive -  the Bacterial Diversity Metadatabase

Aeromonadales
Bacteria described in 1988